The Archery  event at the 2022 Mediterranean Games was held in Oran, Algeria, from 29 June to 1 July 2022.

Medal summary

Medalists

Medal table

References

External links
Official site
Results book

Sports at the 2022 Mediterranean Games
2022
Mediterranean Games